John P. Wheeler Jr. (born August 6, 1947) is an American politician. He has served as a Republican member for the 123rd district in the Kansas House of Representatives since 2017. In March 2018, Wheeler rejected legalizing marijuana.
On March 23, 2022, at the swearing in of the first Indigenous Kansas state representative, Ponka-We Victors-Cozad, Rep. Wheeler commented that he wanted to make sure she was using a gavel and not a tomahawk. Rep. Wheeler later apologized to Rep. Victors-Cozad who did not accept his apology and called for accountability. 
{{Cite https://www.wibw.com/2022/03/25/native-lawmaker-rejects-legislators-apology-racially-insensitive-comment/ He was born and raised in Garden City, Kansas. Shortly after graduation, he served in the United States Air Force and received the Air Force Commendation Medal. After this, he went to work for several law firms and also served as a member of the Federal District Court of the State of Kansas and as a member of the Kansas Supreme Court. He also served as a member of the Tenth Circuit Court of Appeals. Later in his career, he practiced as a sole practitioner and served as the county attorney for Finney County, Kansas. He retired from practicing law in 2013 and served as a member of the Kansas House of Representatives beginning in 2017.

Biography

Early life
John Wheeler was born in 1947 and grew up in Garden City, Kansas. He graduated from Garden City High School in 1965. After high school, he served in the United States Air Force from 1969-1973. He received his bachelor's degree from Fort Hays State University and his JD from Washburn University School of Law in 1976 where he graduated cum laude.

Legal career
Shortly after graduation, he member of the Federal District Court of the State of Kansas and as a member of the Kansas Supreme Court in 1976. In 1978, he served as a member of the Tenth Circuit Court of Appeals. Also during this time, he was an associate at Calihan, Green, Calihan and Loyd from 1976-1979. He then worked at Soldner and Wheeler as a partner from 1979-1987. From 1988-1992, he practiced as an attorney at law/sole practitioner. In 1993 he was elected as the county attorney and served that position until his retirement in 2013.

Politics
Following retirement from his law practice, he ran for and was elected as a member of the Kansas House of Representatives for the 123rd district. In March 2018, he voted to reject legalizing marijuana. He has served on the Judiciary, Transportation, and the Veterans, Military and Homeland Security committees. He also served as a member of the  Kansas Supreme Court Budget Advisory Council in 2013 and a member of the Kansas Supreme Court Blue Ribbon Commission from 2010-2012.

Personal life
He has been a lifelong Republican. His hobbies include golfing, singing and reading. His favorite movies are When Harry Met Sally... and My Cousin Vinny.

Honors and awards
Air Force Commendation Medal
Graduated cum laude from Washburn University School of Law
Inducted into the GCHS Hall of Fame in 2016

References

1947 births
Living people
Republican Party members of the Kansas House of Representatives
21st-century American politicians
Fort Hays State University alumni
Washburn University School of Law alumni